Dolenja Vas pri Čatežu is a small settlement in the Municipality of Trebnje in eastern Slovenia. It lies in the hills north of Trebnje, just east of Čatež. The area is part of the historical Lower Carniola region. The municipality is now included in the Southeast Slovenia Statistical Region.

Name
The name of the settlement was changed from Dolenja vas to Dolenja vas pri Čatežu in 1955.

References

External links
Dolenja Vas pri Čatežu at Geopedia

Populated places in the Municipality of Trebnje